Megachile sidalceae is a species of bee in the family Megachilidae. It was described by Theodore Dru Alison Cockerell in 1897.

References

Sidalceae
Insects described in 1897